Cynoglossus dubius, commonly known as the Carrot tonguesole is a species of tonguefish. It is commonly found in the Indian Ocean off the coast of India.

References
Fishbase

Cynoglossidae
Fish described in 1873